In Marxist philosophy, the dictatorship of the proletariat is a condition in which the proletariat holds state power. The dictatorship of the proletariat is the intermediate stage between a capitalist economy and a communist economy, whereby the post-revolutionary state seizes the means of production, compels the implementation of direct elections on behalf of and within the confines of the ruling proletarian state party, and instituting elected delegates into representative workers' councils that nationalise ownership of the means of production from private to collective ownership. During this phase, the administrative organizational structure of the party is to be largely determined by the need for it to govern firmly and wield state power to prevent counterrevolution and to facilitate the transition to a lasting communist society. Other terms commonly used to describe the dictatorship of the proletariat include socialist state, proletarian state, democratic proletarian state, revolutionary dictatorship of the proletariat and democratic dictatorship of the proletariat.  In Marxist philosophy, the term dictatorship of the bourgeoisie is the antonym to the dictatorship of the proletariat.

Theoretical approaches 
The socialist revolutionary Joseph Weydemeyer coined the term dictatorship of the proletariat, which Karl Marx and Friedrich Engels adopted to their philosophy and economics. The term dictatorship indicates full control of the means of production by the state apparatus. The Paris Commune (1871), which controlled the capital city for two months, before being suppressed, was an example of the dictatorship of the proletariat. There are multiple popular trends for this political thought, all of which believe the state will be retained post-revolution for its enforcement capabilities:
 Marxism–Leninism is an interpretation of Marxism by Vladimir Lenin and his successors. It seeks to organise a vanguard party to lead a proletarian uprising to assume power of the state, the economy, the media, and social services (academia, health, etc.), on behalf of the proletariat and to construct a single-party socialist state representing a dictatorship of the proletariat. The dictatorship of the proletariat is to be governed through the process of democratic centralism, which Lenin described as "diversity in discussion, unity in action". Marxism–Leninism forms the official ideology of the ruling parties of China, Cuba, Laos and Vietnam and was the official ideology of the Communist Party of the Soviet Union from the late 1920s, and later of the other ruling parties making up the Eastern Bloc.
 Libertarian Marxists criticize Marxism–Leninism for perceived differences from orthodox Marxism, opposing the Leninist principle of democratic centralism and the Marxist–Leninist interpretation of vanguardism. Along with Trotskyists, they also oppose the use of a one-party state which they view as inherently undemocratic; however, unlike Trotskyists, Libertarian Marxists are not Bolsheviks, and do not subscribe to democratic centralism nor soviet democracy.  Rosa Luxemburg, a Marxist theorist, emphasized the role of the vanguard party as representative of the whole class and the dictatorship of the proletariat as the entire proletariat's rule, characterizing the dictatorship of the proletariat as a concept meant to expand democracy rather than reduce it—as opposed to minority rule in the dictatorship of the bourgeoisie.

In The Road to Serfdom (1944), the Austrian School economist Friedrich Hayek wrote that the dictatorship of the proletariat likely would destroy personal freedom as completely as does an autocracy. The European Commission of Human Rights found pursuing the dictatorship of the proletariat incompatible with the European Convention on Human Rights in Communist Party of Germany v. the Federal Republic of Germany (1957).

Karl Marx 
While Karl Marx did not write much about the nature of the dictatorship of the proletariat, The Communist Manifesto (1848) stated "their ends can be attained only by the forcible overthrow of all existing social conditions." In light of the Hungarian Revolution of 1848, Marx wrote that "there is only one way in which the murderous death agonies of the old society and the bloody birth throes of the new society can be shortened, simplified and concentrated, and that way is revolutionary terror."

On 1 January 1852, the communist journalist Joseph Weydemeyer published an article entitled "Dictatorship of the Proletariat" in the German language newspaper Turn-Zeitung, where he wrote that "it is quite plain that there cannot be here any question of gradual, peaceful transitions" and recalled the examples of Oliver Cromwell (England) and Committee of Public Safety (France) as examples of "dictatorship" and "terrorism" (respectively) required to overthrow the bourgeoisie. In that year, Marx wrote to him, stating: "Long before me, bourgeois historians had described the historical development of this struggle between the classes, as had bourgeois economists their economic anatomy. My own contribution was (1) to show that the existence of classes is merely bound up with certain historical phases in the development of production; (2) that the class struggle necessarily leads to the dictatorship of the proletariat; [and] (3) that this dictatorship, itself, constitutes no more than a transition to the abolition of all classes and to a classless society."

Marx expanded upon his ideas about the dictatorship of the proletariat in his short 1875 work, Critique of the Gotha Program, a scathing criticism and attack on the principles laid out in the programme of the German Workers' Party (predecessor to the Social Democratic Party of Germany). The programme presented a moderate gradualist, reformist and evolutionary way to socialism as opposed to revolutionary socialist violent approach of the orthodox Marxists. As a result, the latter accused the Gotha program as being "revisionists" and ineffective. Nevertheless, he allowed for the possibility of a peaceful transition in some countries with strong democratic institutional structures (such as the case of Great Britain, the Netherlands and the United States), suggesting however that in other countries in which workers can not "attain their goal by peaceful means" the "lever of our revolution must be force", on the principle that the working people had the right to revolt if they were denied political expression.

Marx stated that in a proletarian-run society the state should control the "proceeds of labour" (i.e. all the food and products produced) and take from them that which was "an economic necessity", namely enough to replace "the means of production used up", an "additional portion for expansion of production" and "insurance funds" to be used in emergencies such as natural disasters. Furthermore, he believed that the state should then take enough to cover administrative costs, funds for the running of public services and funds for those who were physically incapable of working. Once enough to cover all of these things had been taken out of the "proceeds of labour", Marx believed that what was left should then be shared out amongst the workers, with each individual getting goods to the equivalent value of how much labour they had invested. In this meritocratic manner, those workers who put in more labour and worked harder would get more of the proceeds of the collective labour than someone who had not worked as hard. In the Critique, he noted that "defects are inevitable" and there would be many difficulties in initially running such a workers' state "as it emerges from capitalistic society" because it would be "economically, morally and intellectually... still stamped with the birth marks of the old society from whose womb it emerges", thereby still containing capitalist elements.

In summary, Marx's view of the dictatorship of the proletariat involved political experiments focused on dismantling state power and dispersing its functions among the workers.

Friedrich Engels 
Force and violence played an important role in Friedrich Engels's vision of the revolution and rule of proletariat. In 1877, arguing with Eugen Dühring, Engels ridiculed his reservations against use of force, stating: "That force, however, plays yet another role in history, a revolutionary role; that, in the words of Marx, it is the midwife of every old society pregnant with a new one, that it is the instrument with the aid of which social movement forces its way through and shatters the dead, fossilised political forms."

In the 1891 postscript to The Civil War in France (1872) pamphlet, Engels stated: "Well and good, gentlemen, do you want to know what this dictatorship looks like? Look at the Paris Commune. That was the Dictatorship of the Proletariat." To avoid bourgeois political corruption, Engels claimed that "the Commune made use of two infallible expedients. In this first place, it filled all posts—administrative, judicial, and educational—by election on the basis of universal suffrage of all concerned, with the right of the same electors to recall their delegate at any time. And, in the second place, all officials, high or low, were paid only the wages received by other workers. The highest salary paid by the Commune to anyone was 6,000 francs. In this way an effective barrier to place-hunting and careerism was set up, even apart from the binding mandates to delegates [and] to representative bodies, which were also added in profusion." In the same year, he criticised "anti-authoritarian socialists", again referring to the methods of the Paris Commune, remarking: "A revolution is certainly the most authoritarian thing there is; it is the act whereby one part of the population imposes its will upon the other part by means of rifles, bayonets and cannon—authoritarian means, if such there be at all; and if the victorious party does not want to have fought in vain, it must maintain this rule by means of the terror which its arms inspire in the reactionists. Would the Paris Commune have lasted a single day if it had not made use of this authority of the armed people against the bourgeois?".

Marx's attention to the Paris Commune placed the commune in the centre of later Marxist forms. This statement was written in "Address of the Central Committee to the Communist League", which is credited to Marx and Engels: "[The workers] must work to ensure that the immediate revolutionary excitement is not suddenly suppressed after the victory. On the contrary, it must be sustained as long as possible. Far from opposing the so-called excesses—instances of popular vengeance against hated individuals or against public buildings with which hateful memories are associated—the workers' party must not only tolerate these actions but must even give them direction."

Vladimir Lenin 
In the 20th century, Vladimir Lenin developed his own variation of Marxism, known as Leninism—the adaptation of Marxism to the socio-economic and political conditions of Imperial Russia (1721–1917). This body of theory later became the official ideology of some Communist states. Lenin wrote that the  Marxist concept of dictatorship meant an entire societal class holds political and economic control, within a democratic system. Lenin argued for the destruction of the foundations of the bourgeois state and its replacement with what David Priestland described as an "ultra-democratic" dictatorship of the proletariat based on the Paris Commune's system.

The State and Revolution (1917) explicitly discusses the practical implementation of "dictatorship of the proletariat" through means of violent revolution. Lenin denies any reformist interpretations of Marxism such as these of Eduard Bernstein and Karl Kautsky's. Lenin especially focused on Engels' phrase of the state "withering away", denying that it could apply to "bourgeois state" and highlighting that Engels work is mostly "panegyric on violent revolution". Based on these arguments, he denounces reformists as "opportunistic", reactionary and points out violent revolution as the only method of introducing dictatorship of the proletariat compliant with Marx and Engels' work.

In Imperial Russia, the Paris Commune model form of government was realised in the soviets (councils of workers and soldiers) established in the Russian Revolution of 1905, whose revolutionary task was deposing the capitalist (monarchical) state to establish socialism—the dictatorship of the proletariat—the stage preceding communism. In Russia, the Bolshevik Party (described by Lenin as the "vanguard of the proletariat") elevated the soviets to power in the October Revolution of 1917. Throughout 1917, Lenin argued that the Russian Provisional Government was unrepresentative of the proletariat's interests because in his estimation they represented the dictatorship of the bourgeoisie. He argued that because they continually put off democratic elections, they denied the prominence of the democratically constituted soviets and all the promises made by liberal bourgeois parties prior to the February Revolution remained unfulfilled, the soviets would need to take power for themselves.

Proletarian government 

Lenin argued that in an underdeveloped country such as Russia the capitalist class would remain a threat even after a successful socialist revolution. As a result, he advocated the repression of those elements of the capitalist class that took up arms against the new soviet government, writing that as long as classes existed a state would need to exist to exercise the democratic rule of one class (in his view, the working class) over the other (the capitalist class). Lenin wrote that "[d]ictatorship does not necessarily mean the abolition of democracy for the class that exercises the dictatorship over other classes; but it does mean the abolition of democracy (or very material restriction, which is also a form of abolition) for the class over which, or against which, the dictatorship is exercised." After World War I, Karl Kautsky became a critic of the Bolshevik Revolution, and was famously denounced by Lenin as a "renegade".

The use of violence, terror and rule of a single communist party was criticised by other Marxists, including Karl Kautsky, and Rosa Luxemburg, as well as Anarcho-Communists like Peter Kropotkin. In the early 1930s, the socialist movements that did not support the Bolshevik party line were condemned by the Communist International and called social fascism.

Soviet democracy granted voting rights to the majority of the populace who elected the local soviets, who elected the regional soviets and so on until electing the Supreme Soviet of the Soviet Union. Capitalists were disenfranchised in the Russian soviet model. However, according to Lenin in a developed country it would be possible to dispense with the disenfranchisement of capitalists within the democratic proletarian dictatorship as the proletariat would be guaranteed of an overwhelming majority. The Bolsheviks in 1917–1924 did not claim to have achieved a communist society. In contrast the preamble to the 1977 Constitution (Fundamental Law) of the Union of Soviet Socialist Republics (the "Brezhnev Constitution"), stated that the 1917 Revolution established the dictatorship of the proletariat as "a society of true democracy" and that "the supreme goal of the Soviet state is the building of a classless, communist society in which there will be public, communist self-government."

Banning of opposition parties and factions 
During the Russian Civil War (1918–1922), all the major opposition parties either took up arms against the new Soviet government, took part in sabotage, collaboration with the deposed Tsarists, or made assassination attempts against Lenin and other Bolshevik leaders. When opposition parties such as the Cadets and Mensheviks were democratically elected to the Soviets in some areas, they proceeded to use their mandate to welcome in Tsarist and foreign capitalist military forces. In one incident in Baku, the British military, once invited in, proceeded to execute members of the Bolshevik Party (who had peacefully stood down from the Soviet when they failed to win the elections). As a result, the Bolsheviks banned each opposition party when it turned against the Soviet government. In some cases, bans were lifted. This banning of parties did not have the same repressive character as later bans under Stalin would.

Internally, Lenin's critics argued that such political suppression always was his plan. Supporters argued that the reactionary civil war of the foreign-sponsored White movement required it—given Fanya Kaplan's unsuccessful assassination of Lenin on 30 August 1918 and the successful assassination of Moisei Uritsky the same day. After 1919, the Soviets had ceased to function as organs of democratic rule as the famine induced by forced grain requisitions led to the Soviets emptying out of ordinary people. Half the population of Moscow and a third of Petrograd had by this stage fled to the countryside to find food and political life ground to a halt.

The Bolsheviks became concerned that under these conditions—the absence of mass participation in political life and the banning of opposition parties—counter-revolutionary forces would express themselves within the Bolshevik Party itself (some evidence existed for this in the mass of ex-opposition party members who signed up for Bolshevik membership immediately after the end of the Civil War). Despite the principle of democratic centralism in the Bolshevik Party, internal factions were banned. This was considered an extreme measure and did not fall within Marxist doctrine. The ban remained until the Soviet Union's dissolution in 1991. In 1921, vigorous internal debate and freedom of opinion were still present within Russia and the beginnings of censorship and mass political repression had not yet emerged. The Workers Opposition faction continued to operate despite being nominally dissolved. The debates of the Communist Party of the Soviet Union continued to be published until 1923.

USSR after Stalin 
At the 22nd Congress of the Communist Party of the Soviet Union, Nikita Khrushchev declared an end to the "dictatorship of the proletariat" and the establishment of the "all people's government".

China 
At its founding, the People's Republic of China took the form of a people's democratic dictatorship. In summary, this meant a democracy for the revolutionary people (viewed as the great majority of the population) and the coercive measures implicit in "dictatorship" for counterrevolutionaries. This form of state in favor of the peasantry, proletariat, and others who could assert revolutionary consciousness made no pretense of impartiality. 

In the Maoist view of the dictatorship of the proletariat was not exercised by the proletariat as a class in and of itself, but instead by those with the correct "proletarian consciousness." The beliefs and values which comprised the necessary Maoist proletarian consciousness were matters of political and intellectual debate, subject to re-definition over time. 

The Great Proletarian Cultural Revolution (GPCR) questioned the dictatorship of the proletariat as previously implemented in socialism, particularly the fact that state functions had ultimately became the purview of party officials/cadres instead of becoming more broadly dispersed. One of the GPCR's major components was a form of mass politics intended to put state power into the hands of the common people. As Mao told the Red Guards in the early phase of the Cultural Revolution, all of them had "to be concerned about the affairs of the state." Ultimately, the GPCR failed to complete this reimagining of what the dictatorship of the proletariat might be.

Contemporary perspectives 
Communist Party of the Philippines theorist and activist Jose Maria Sison describes the dictatorship of the proletariat as a "socialist democracy" for the proletariat and the other exploited classes, without which a proletarian state is incapable of securing democracy for the entire people. Sison writes, "While dictatorship of the proletariat may sound terrifying to some and evoke images of indiscriminate acts of violence, it is a well-established principle of scientific socialism to remove the economic basis of class oppression and exploitation and to give even the members of the erstwhile exploiting classes the amplest opportunity to remold themselves and contribute what they can to the progress of socialist society." Under this conception, the dictatorship of the proletariat makes political allowances and respects legitimate interests of sections of the bourgeoisie which join the revolution because "it has never occurred that the proletariat has ascended to power without allies." In contrast, “the coercive apparatuses of class dictatorship are applied on those who have no desire but to destroy or subvert the socialist society.”

See also 
 Democracy in Marxism
 Democratic Marxism
 Government of China
 People's democratic dictatorship

References

External links

Critique of the Gotha Programme
The Civil War in France
Marxists.org glossary term
"The 'Dictatorship of the Proletariat' in Marx and Engels" by Hal Draper

Authoritarianism
Democracy
Dictatorship
Ideology of the Communist Party of the Soviet Union
Marxist terminology
Types of democracy